Trinchera Peak is a mountain in Costilla County and Huerfano County in the U.S. state of Colorado. It is located in the Culebra Range.

References

Mountains of Colorado
Mountains of Huerfano County, Colorado
Mountains of Costilla County, Colorado
North American 4000 m summits